1998 Denmark Open is a darts tournament, which took place in Denmark in 1998.

Results

References

1998 in darts
1998 in Danish sport
Darts in Denmark